The 2014–15 Georgie Pie Super Smash (named after the competition's sponsor McDonald's iconic New Zealand brand Georgie Pie) was the tenth season of the Men's Super Smash Twenty20 cricket tournament in New Zealand. The competition ran from 1 November 2014 to 7 December 2014. The tournament was won by the Wellington Firebirds for the first time, after they defeated Auckland Aces in the final by six runs.

Points table

 Teams qualified for the finals

Finals

1st Preliminary Final

2nd Preliminary Final

Final

References

External links
 Series home at ESPN Cricinfo

New Zealand domestic cricket competitions
Super Smash (cricket)